Juan Arturo Grompone Carbonell (Montevideo, 1939) is a Uruguayan engineer and writer.

He is a member of the National Academy of Economics and also of the Academia Nacional de Letras (english: "National Academy of Letters").

Selected works
1991, Ciao Napolitano! 
1992, Asesinato en el hotel de baños 
1992, Yo hombre, tú computadora 
1994, La conexión MAM 
2014, La danza de Shiva V.
2015, El incidente Malvinas 
2019, Marx hoy

References

External links

1939 births
Living people
Uruguayan people of Italian descent
20th-century Uruguayan engineers
Uruguayan industrial engineers
Uruguayan computer scientists
Uruguayan educators
Uruguayan male writers
Uruguayan novelists
Uruguayan essayists
Uruguayan male short story writers
Members of the Uruguayan Academy of Language